The Our Lady of the Most Holy Rosary Cathedral Parish, commonly known as Naval Cathedral, is a 20th-century church building of the Catholic Church in the municipality of Naval, Biliran, Philippines. It is the cathedral of the Roman Catholic Diocese of Naval.

History

The island of Biliran used to be part of the Leyte-Samar province during the Spanish Philippines period. The parish of Naval, then known as "Bagasumbul", was founded in 1860. It later became a separate pueblo from the town of Biliran in 1869 after a petition for its independence was submitted in 1861. In the latter half of the 19th century, the first church of Naval was built but was destroyed by a typhoon in 1912. A new church was then constructed which would eventually undergo a facade renovation under the helm of Fr. Deodato Esplanada in 1950. This was replaced with the new and present edifice which was built in 1965. The church became a cathedral when the Diocese of Naval was founded in 1988. The diocese comprises Biliran and extreme northwestern Leyte province.

References

External links
 Facebook page 

Roman Catholic churches in Biliran
Roman Catholic cathedrals in the Philippines
20th-century Roman Catholic church buildings in the Philippines